This list of governors of Kivu includes governors or equivalent officer holders of the province in the Belgian Congo created as Costermansville Province in 1933 from part of the old Orientale Province. The province was renamed Kivu Province in 1947.
It was broken into the provinces of Maniema, North Kivu and South Kivu from 10 May 1962 to 28 December 1966, then reunited.
In 1988 it was again broken up into the provinces of Maniema, North Kivu and South Kivu.

First period (1933–1962)

The province was named Costermansville Province from 1933 to 1947, then Kivu Province
The governors or equivalent officer holders were:

Successor provinces (1962–1966)

 List of governors of Maniema
 List of governors of North Kivu
 List of governors of South Kivu

Second period (1966–1988)

The governors or equivalent officer holders were:

See also

List of governors of Orientale Province
Lists of provincial governors of the Democratic Republic of the Congo

References

Governors of provinces of the Democratic Republic of the Congo

¨*